AFSA may refer to:

 Australian Financial Security Authority, an Australian Government agency.
 Astana Financial Services Authority.
 American Federation of School Administrators.
 American Financial Services Association.
 Air Force Sergeants Association.
 Armed Forces Security Agency, precursor to the US National Security Agency.
 American Foreign Service Association.
Albanian Financial Supervisory Authority.